Bonyanabad (also Romanized as Bonyānābād; also known as Bonyādābād) is a village in Garmeh-ye Jonubi Rural District, in the Central District of Meyaneh County, East Azerbaijan Province, Iran. At the 2006 census, its population was 26, in 6 families.

References 

Populated places in Meyaneh County